Museum Autovision is a museum for cars, motorcycles, bicycles (most of which were built by NSU Motorenwerke AG) and alternative propulsion in Altlußheim, a small town in Baden-Württemberg, Germany.

The exhibits include the original equipment from an NSU workshop from the 1920s.

The museum also has a display of more than 80 Wankel engines; on display are also a dozen cars and three bicycles with Wankel engines. This also includes a cut-away model of the NSU Ro 80.

For owners of electric cars a solar filling station is maintained.

Science arena

The museum also has metal models that allow car parts such as engine, automatic transmission and differential to be traced, and metal models on power transfer. Finally, boxes are available for scientific experiments with prepared topics. There are about 50 moveable models that allow visitors to conduct interactive physics experiments under real conditions. Topics include:
 Mechanics
 Caloric theory (Calorifics)
 Optics and acoustics
 Magnetism
 Electricity
 Electrochemistry.

Exhibits

External links

Website

Transport museums in Germany
Museums in Baden-Württemberg
Rhein-Neckar-Kreis
Automobile museums in Germany
Cycling museums and halls of fame